Sudhakar Vitthalrao Kohale (born 1 July 1969) was a member of the 13th Maharashtra Legislative Assembly, from 2014 to 2019, representing the Nagpur South Assembly Constituency. He belongs to the Bharatiya Janata Party

Kohale was a corporator in the Nagpur Municipal Corporation (NMC) at the time of election, he then represented the Mhalgi Nagar ward. Kohale defeated sitting MLA Dinanath Padole, of the Nationalist Congress Party and former minister Satish Chaturvedi of the Indian National Congress. Fifteen opponents including Padole lost their deposit. This victory has been described as one busting caste and religious vote bank politics, and a mandate for development. Kohale was chairman of NMC's Water Works Committee.

Early life
Mr. Kohale was a teacher in Navyug Vidyalaya, Mahal, Nagpur.

Child Hood : As Mr. Sudhakar Kohale ( MLA &  Nagpur City President) has faced many up and downs in his life . As on college time period while going to college first he sells milk on bicycle, After then he attend college.

Education and early career

Family and personal life

Political career
MLA South Nagpur since 2014. He is currently General Secretary Nagpur BJPCity Unit.

Positions held

Within BJP

President, Nagpur Mahanagar BJP
General Secretary, NagpurBJP

Legislative

Corporator, Nagpur Municipal Corporation
Member, Maharashtra Legislative Assembly 2014

References

Living people
Maharashtra MLAs 2014–2019
1970 births
Marathi politicians
Bharatiya Janata Party politicians from Maharashtra